Democratic Socialist Party is a Democratic Socialist political party in India. The party was formed in 1981 when H.N Bahuguna came out of the then Janata Party and took the lead in forming it.The party is almost completely limited to West Bengal. The party was formed when the Bengali socialists, who had been part of Janata Party, were divided in two in the beginning of the 1980s. The other faction became the West Bengal Socialist Party.

DSP is part of the Left Front in West Bengal. The party leader Prabodh Chandra Sinha, was a Minister of Parliamentary Affairs in the state government. Sinha was elected to the state assembly in 2001 as an independent candidate from the Egra constituency. At that time DSP was not registered at the Election Commission of India. Now the party has once again registered, under the name Democratic Socialist Party (Prabodh Chandra).The party has influences in parts of East Midnapore and West Midnapore.

DSP has tried to contact the Socialist International, but have been denied membership on the grounds that they are a regional party.

DSP has won the Pingla constituency seat in the 2011 assembly poll in West Bengal as party's candidate Prof. Prabodh Sinha won the seat as Left Front candidate. Party's other candidate Prof. Hrishikesh Paria lost the Egra seat in East Midnapore. DSP has a zilla parishad seat in East Midnapore district. It has a municipal seat in the Egra municipality as of 2009 municipal polls. In 2010 Kolkata Municipal polls, the party was allotted 2 seats to contest as a LF partner in Ward Nos. 45 & 72 respectively.  It lost both of them. It has won a Zilla Parishad seat in East Midnapore in 2008 panchayet polls.
The party believes in the ideals of Jayaprakash Narain, Ram Manohar Lohia and Narendra Dev .

Prabodh Sinha has won the Pingla seat in 2011 but the party has lost the Egra seat.

References

External links

Election results from Egra

Political parties in West Bengal
Socialist parties in India
1981 establishments in West Bengal
Political parties established in 1981